Davydovo is a rural locality (a village) in Andreyevskoye Rural Settlement, Vashkinsky District, Vologda Oblast, Russia. The population was 117 as of 2002. There are 7 streets.

Geography 
Davydovo is located 26 km north of Lipin Bor (the district's administrative centre) by road. Kononovo is the nearest rural locality.

References 

Rural localities in Vashkinsky District